Kenshi is a fictional character from the Mortal Kombat fighting game franchise by Midway Games and NetherRealm Studios. He makes his series debut in Mortal Kombat: Deadly Alliance (2002) as a blind swordsman who possesses telekinetic abilities and serves as an operative for the Special Forces.

Outside of the games, Kenshi has appeared in various related media, including comic books, the 2011 web series Mortal Kombat Legacy, and the 2022 animated film Mortal Kombat Legends: Snow Blind. Reception to the character has been positive, while he is regarded as the best fighter from the series' three-dimensional era and is one of the few characters to successfully transition to the current two-dimensional series of games.

Appearances

Mortal Kombat games
As a born fighter, Takahashi Kenshi wandered Earthrealm in search of worthy competition, defeating opponents simply to boost his pride. One day Kenshi encountered a man named Song, who led him to the supposed location of an ancient, powerful sword he claimed would befit Kenshi's power. When Kenshi opens a well inside the tomb where the sword supposedly lay, he is overwhelmed by souls trapped within and permanently blinded. Song then reveals himself as the sorcerer Shang Tsung, who then absorbs the released souls and leaves Kenshi for dead. However, the sword, named "Sento", does actually exist and it speaks telepathically to Kenshi, leading him from the tomb and revealing its origin. The weapon was passed down a long line of great swordsmen from whom Kenshi descended, while the imprisoned souls were those of his ancestors. Kenshi focused on retraining his senses thereafter, all while searching for his betrayer and the defiler of his ancestry.

In Mortal Kombat: Deadly Alliance (2002), Kenshi's special abilities catch the attention of Jax Briggs and Sonya Blade, who were looking to enlist members with special talents into their Special Forces unit and venture on a mission into the otherworldly dimension of Outworld. Believing this would give him an opportunity to pursue Shang Tsung, Kenshi joins their ranks after passing many tests and examinations. He is then assigned to find missing fellow Special Forces member Cyrax, but during his search, Kenshi encounters the enigmatic Ermac, and, in a moment of pity, breaks the mind control that the now-deceased Outworld emperor Shao Kahn still had over him. In gratitude, Ermac awakens Kenshi's latent telekinetic power, and teaches him not only how to use it effectively in combat, but how to sense the presence of people and objects around him. Kenshi soon discovers the plans of the Deadly Alliance (Shang Tsung and Quan Chi), but is unable to contact Jax and Sonya's Outer World Investigation Agency after it is bombed by Red Dragon clan member Hsu Hao. The Deadly Alliance are also aware of Kenshi's presence and send fellow clansman Mavado to kill him. Mavado defeats Kenshi in combat and leaves him to die.

In Mortal Kombat: Deception (2004), Sub-Zero finds the dying Kenshi and nurses him back to health. Kenshi subsequently forges an alliance with Sub-Zero, but as they try to find their way back to Earthrealm, they clash with Seidan Guardsman leader Hotaru, who has pledged loyalty to the Dragon King Onaga and is pursuing Sub-Zero. 

Kenshi is playable along with the entire series roster in the compilation title Mortal Kombat: Armageddon (2006), and was one of only seventeen characters for whom Midway provided an official biography. After Shang Tsung is believed slain by Onaga during the events of Deception, Kenshi senses his ancestors' souls returning to his sword that indicates the end of his quest for vengeance. He therefore amiably splits from Sub-Zero and returns to Earthrealm, where he also parts ways with the Special Forces in order to work alone in hunting down the corrupt, during which he successfully eliminates several criminal organizations. He becomes aware of the Red Dragon's plans to capture the Edenian demigod Taven (the game's main protagonist), but before he can find their secret base, Kenshi encounters Johnny Cage, who asks him to join his "Forces of Light" to battle the evil former Elder God Shinnok. Kenshi dismisses it as another pointless struggle between good and evil, but after he receives a psychic premonition of Taven and his brother Daegon's quest to defeat the fire elemental Blaze, and at the urging of his sword, Kenshi changes his mind and decides that he will indeed lead the Forces of Light into battle. He otherwise plays no significant role in the game's storyline and is absent from its training mode. In the game's opening cinematic sequence that depicts a battle royal among the combatants at the Pyramid of Argus in the fictional realm of Edenia, he comes to the aid of Ermac and Nightwolf after Sheeva overpowers them, but is attacked by Quan Chi. After Ermac hurls Quan Chi off the pyramid, he then stomps on Kenshi before revealing himself as Shang Tsung in disguise.

In the 2011 Mortal Kombat reboot that retells the continuity of the first three series titles, Kenshi was made available as a downloadable character (DLC) after the game's release, with his in-game biography copied from Deadly Alliance. 

Kenshi is immediately selectable in Mortal Kombat X (2015), in which he is a consultant to a Special Forces unit led by Johnny Cage and Sonya Blade that is spearheading Earthrealm's fight against Shinnok and Quan Chi's forces in the Netherrealm war. His backstory is expanded in that during his travels in his previous series appearances, he engages in a short-lived relationship with a Thai-American woman named Suchin. However, during his hunt for the Red Dragon, his cover is blown and she is killed several years later, after which Kenshi discovers he is the father of her illegitimate son Takeda, whom he leaves at the age of eight in the care of Hanzo Hasashi both for training and his own protection. These events, coupled with Kenshi's lack of contact in the duration, results in a strained relationship between him and Takeda upon their reunion, but the two reconcile in a flashback during the main story with Kenshi teaching Takeda — now grown and a member of the aforementioned Special Forces unit — how to utilize his telepathy in the intervening years. Kenshi joins the Earthrealm heroes in battling Shinnok in the climax of the story mode, but is quickly defeated, with his fate afterwards unknown.

Character design and gameplay
In Deadly Alliance character designer Allen Ditzig's early concept sketches, the character was called "the Kenshi" and described as a "spirit hunter." During development, Kenshi was originally named "Blind Gi" during the game's production, which was changed to "Blind Kenshi" before his final name was determined. Mortal Kombat co-creator Ed Boon explained to Playstation.Blog in 2011 that he was "personally always a big fan of Kenshi, as were many of the guys on the MK team" as the reason for including him in the 2011 reboot game.

Kenshi was originally conceived as a replacement for Ermac as the series' main psychokinetic character, while integrating a physical weapon into his offensive arsenal from which he channels his powers. GameSpy described Kenshi's special moves in MK: Deception as similar to Ermac's but "not as comboable," while citing his sword as his most potent attack in the game. According to the site's Armageddon walkthrough, Kenshi is a midrange attacker whose special moves were best utilized at that distance, as anything closer makes him "vulnerable to counterattacks." In the 2011 reboot, Kenshi's powers enable him to create a temporary psychic clone of himself. Julian Williams of VGChartz said that while "Ermac's abilities rely on pushing, pulling, and throws," Kenshi's offense "relies on long-range invisible punches," and he is "all about combo potential at a distance." In Mortal Kombat X, Kenshi's playstyle is split into three distinct variations like those of the game's other selectable characters.

Other media

Kenshi appears in two episodes in the 2013 second season of director Kevin Tancharoen's Mortal Kombat: Legacy web series, for which his association with Ermac in Deadly Alliance was loosely adapted. He is first seen on Shang Tsung's island along with fellow Earthrealm fighters Cage, Stryker, Kung Lao, and Sub-Zero as Raiden fills them in on what to expect at the Mortal Kombat tournament. The story then flashes back to feudal Japan, where Kenshi is a rōnin who differs little in physical appearance save for having long hair and his eyesight. He rescues an old traveler from a trio of bandits whom he kills easily, and the traveler later tells Kenshi about the "sword of Sento", created by Shao Kahn and hidden in a cave where the demonic Ermac guards it. When Kenshi enters the cave and attempts to take the weapon, Ermac instantly strikes him blind. The following episode shows a present-day Kenshi in possession of the sword that Ermac attempts to reclaim by battling him in the tournament, during which Kenshi discovers he possesses psychokinetic powers, as does Ermac, but Kenshi emerges victorious after fatally impaling Ermac with the sword. Kenshi was played by martial artist Dan Southworth, who said that the blindfold he wore during shooting was real, and that there were "moments where I was just swinging my arms out and was hoping that it connected in the right place, or not."

Kenshi appears in DC Comics' 2015 prequel comic miniseries Mortal Kombat X: Blood Ties, which is set before the events of the game. He first appears with the young Takeda having been hunted down by Hsu Hao until they are rescued by Hanzo Hasashi, who kills Hsu Hao and then takes in Takeda for his own protection and to train as an apprentice of Hanzo's Shirai Ryu clan. Series writer Shawn Kittelsen said in an interview with IGN that his decision to include Kenshi in the comic "was a nod to all the fans that love this telekinetic Zatoichi as much as I do." 

Kenshi is the featured character of the 2022 direct-to-video animated film Mortal Kombat Legends: Snow Blind, and was voiced by Manny Jacinto. He is depicted as a young warrior trained by Sub-Zero to defeat Kano's Black Dragon clan in a post-apocalyptic Earthrealm, with the in-game story of his blinding at the hands of Shang Tsung integrated into the plot.

Reception
Kenshi is regarded as one of the Mortal Kombat series' top characters by gaming media outlets. While UGO Networks rated him a middling 29th in their 2012 list of the top 50 Mortal Kombat characters, Den of Geek rated him seventh in their 2015 ranking of the franchise's 73 playable characters, calling him "the best design to come out past the original trilogy" with "a look that feels like Solid Snake mixed with Daredevil." Complex rated Deadly Alliance third in their 2021 rating of the series' fighting titles due to its combination of "classic fighters and the new ones — like Kenshi the blind swordsman — which made us excited for the franchise’s future," a point of view shared by Ravi Sinha of GamingBolt in 2022. Jason Wojnar of Screen Rant wrote in 2021, "The series had a hard time introducing new characters that stuck once it transitioned into three dimensions. Kenshi, however, wooed fans from the start with his look and interesting backstory. ... His time in the games may be short compared to many other fighters, but he has quickly become a series mainstay as if he was there from the beginning.”

Brittany Vincent of IGN said in her review of Mortal Kombat Legends: Snow Blind that "centering the plot mostly around Kenshi is a smart move" and "it's refreshing to see a character that doesn't get much screen time shine for a bit", but criticized the plot for "spend[ing] too much time elsewhere away from Kenshi when we’ve already been drawn in and want to learn more about him."

Notes

References

Fictional Eurasian people
Fictional Japanese people in video games
Fictional martial artists in video games
Fictional Ninjutsu practitioners
Fictional blind characters
Fictional judoka
Fictional kenjutsuka
Fictional male martial artists
Fictional sanshou practitioners
Fictional swordfighters in video games
Fictional tai chi practitioners
Fictional telekinetics
Male characters in video games
Mortal Kombat characters
Telepath characters in video games
Video game characters introduced in 2002
Video game characters who can teleport
Video game protagonists

fr:Personnages de Mortal Kombat#Kenshi
pl:Kenshi
pt:Kenshi (Mortal Kombat)
ru:Kenshi